Denis Aleksandrovich Fomin (born 3 May 1996) is a Russian football defender. He plays for FC SKA-Khabarovsk.

Club career
He made his debut in the Russian Second Division for FC Tekstilshchik Ivanovo on 20 April 2013 in a game against FC Znamya Truda Orekhovo-Zuyevo.

He made his Russian Premier League debut on 7 March 2015 for FC Ural Yekaterinburg in a game against FC Zenit Saint Petersburg.

References

External links

1996 births
People from Kostanay Region
Living people
Russian footballers
Russia under-21 international footballers
Association football defenders
FC Tekstilshchik Ivanovo players
FC Ural Yekaterinburg players
FC Tambov players
FC SKA-Khabarovsk players
Russian Premier League players
Russian First League players
Russian Second League players